Octolepidoideae is a subfamily and one of the earliest branches of the Thymelaeaceae family.
This species inherited multiple morphological character states from its ancestor, Thymelaeaceae. The  calyx of a typical octolepidoideae is 5-merous. Researchers have found the species to contain 4-merous and 6-merous calyces, albeit they remain rarer.

The pollen of most octolepidoideae are provided with small spinules on the outer covering of their pollen grains.

References 

 
Rosid subfamilies